Zaheer Farooqui (Adv.) is the Chairman of Nagar Panchayat, Purkazi, a town in Muzaffar Nagar district of Uttar Pradesh, India. He is also the State General Secretary and Advisor of Bharatiya Kisan Union.

He is popular for uplifting the socio-economic and cultural status of the people of Purkazi. One of his prominent works has been his restless struggle since 2014 to get the status of  'Shaheed Sthal' (Martyr Place) for Suli Wala Bagh.

Political career
He ended the seventy years long dominance of a particular family in the local politics to become the Chairman of Purkazi in 2017. He came in the limelight due to his efforts to give due recognition to Suli Wala Bagh. On 26 January 2019, the people of Purkazi protested under his leadership by tying the gallows around their neck and demanded the historical location to be recognized as a Martyr's Place.

On 17 May 2019, Zaheer Farooqui (Adv.) offered to resign owing to the conspiracy hatched to assassinate him. In order to express solidarity with Mr. Zaheer, the entire staff of Nagar Panchayat Purkazi offered to resign en masse. The protest was also joined by the Bharatiya Kisan Union President Raju Ahlawat along with many BKU activists.

Welfare Works
The Nagar Panchayat, under the supervision of Zaheer Farooqui, has come up with an advanced and ‘women only’ gym worth Rs 25 Lakh. Inaugurated on 20 October 2019, the Chairman Farooqui dedicated this gym as a ‘Diwali gift to womenfolk’ of Purkazi. It aims at boosting the fitness of women and has been built with the help of funds released by the union government. On the suggestion of BKU leader Rakesh Tikait, the Nagar Panchayat chairman invited the oldest woman of Purkazi, Rajbala, an octogenarian to inaugurate the gym.

Among other developments in the Purkazi town of Muzaffarnagar, Farooqui had installed 40 CCTV cameras in the entry and exit points of the Utar Pradesh-Uttarakhand border, which are instrumental in making the place crime free. His effort has helped to curb the incidents of cattle, bike and other thefts. He also proposed the idea of 'Pink toilet' for females in the market and introduced the sanitary pad dispenser. The endeavors of Zaheer Farooqui in spreading the awareness about sacrifices made during the uprising of 1857 are also commendable. Due to his initiative, the Nagar Panchayat has also started hoisting the tricolor inside the Suliwala Bagh on 26 January and 15 August.

The Cannon Episode 
Zaheer Farooqui is the only person in independent India to get a case registered against him on the charge of capturing a cannon.

The incident took place in the Hari Nagar village of the Purkazi area in Muzaffar Nagar, UP. The digging ordered by Purkazi Chairman took place on the complaint of a local resident who claimed his farm field contained artillery of the times of the British Empire. Evidently, a rusty cannon was unearthed on Jan 20, 2020, which the localites believed to be one of the remains of the 1857 war of independence.

Briefing the media, Chairman Zaheer Farooqui said that the freedom fighters in Purkazi ambushed the British troops bravely in the Indian Rebellion of 1857. During the war, the Indians snatched the arms and ammunition from the British soldiers. They buried the consignment later on in the Purkazi area. The recovered cannon which is about 9 ft. long and weighed more than 40 quintal, is the reminiscent of the same era.

Hailing the cannon as a souvenir of the glorious history of Purkazi, Zaheer Farooqui vowed to establish it in the historical Suli Wala Bagh where the British soldiers hanged more than four hunder Indians till death during the revolt of 1857. Zaheer got an overwhelming support of the local people as well as the Bhartiya Kisan Union (BKU) Chief Rakesh Tikait. All of them unanimously rejected the administration’s decision to hand over the cannon to the Archaeological Survey of India. Rakesh Tikait also termed the cannon as a “Symbol of honour” of the martyrs who were killed by the British army in Suli Wala Bagh.

The cannon remained in the custody of the villagers under the supervision of Zaheer Farooqui and several top leaders of BKU for three days. Eventually, the administration acquired its possession amid heavy security and handed it over to ASI, which took it to the Agra lab for inspection.

Holding Zaheer Farooqui responsible for not handling over the cannon to the ASI and capturing it by force, an F.I.R was registered against him in the Hari Nagar village on Jan 22, 2020. The writ petition saw a massive protest by the Bhartiya Kisan Union and the local residents of Muzaffar Nagar. In Nov 2020, the Prayagraj High Court however rejected the case and the charge sheet filed against Farooqui, thus allowing him a big relief.

Meanwhile, the recovery of the Cannon also added weight to the age old demand of the people of Purkazi to give ‘Suli Wala Bagh’ the heritage status.

References 

Year of birth missing (living people)
Living people